Aulacodes chalcialis is a moth in the family Crambidae. It was described by George Hampson in 1906. It is found in São Paulo, Brazil.

References

Acentropinae
Moths described in 1906
Moths of South America